A Gaussian grid is used in the earth sciences as a gridded horizontal coordinate system for scientific modeling on a sphere (i.e., the approximate shape of the Earth). The grid is rectangular, with a set number of orthogonal coordinates (usually latitude and longitude). 

At a given latitude (or parallel), the gridpoints are equally spaced. On the contrary along a longitude (or meridian) the gridpoints are unequally spaced. The spacing between grid points is defined by Gaussian quadrature. By contrast, in the "normal" geographic latitude-longitude grid, gridpoints are equally spaced along both latitudes and longitudes. Gaussian grids also have no grid points at the poles. 

In a regular Gaussian grid, the number of gridpoints along the longitudes is constant, usually double the number along the latitudes. In a reduced (or thinned) Gaussian grid, the number of gridpoints in the rows decreases towards the poles, which keeps the gridpoint separation approximately constant across the sphere.

Examples of Gaussian grids 
 CCCma global climate models of climate change
 [96×48]
 [128×64]
 European Centre for Medium-Range Weather Forecasts
 192×96
 320×160
 512×256
 640×320
 800×400
 1024×512
 1600×800
 2048×1024
 2560×1280
 Features for ERA-40 grids

See also 
Global climate model
Spectral method
Spherical harmonics

References 
NCAR Command Language documentation
 W.M. Washington and C.L. Parkinson, 2005. An Introduction to Three-Dimensional Climate Modeling. Sausalito, CA, University Science Books. 368 pp.
 Hortal, Mariano, and A. J. Simmons, 1991. Use of reduced Gaussian grids in spectral models. Monthly Weather Review 119.4 : 1057-1074.

Geodesy
Geographic coordinate systems